Boulevard de Maisonneuve may refer to:

 De Maisonneuve Boulevard in Montreal
 Boulevard Maisonneuve in Gatineau